Niue has competed six times in the Commonwealth Games to date, in 2002, 2006, 2010, 2014, 2018, and 2022.

Medal tally

History
Niue first participated at the Games in 2002 in Manchester, England with a team of athletes in Boxing, Athletics, Rugby Sevens and shooting.

List of medalists

References

 
Nations at the Commonwealth Games